Trouble Maker is the ninth studio album by the American punk rock band Rancid, released on June 9, 2017. Like many of Rancid's albums, Trouble Maker was produced by Epitaph founder and Bad Religion guitarist Brett Gurewitz, and marks the band's first album since their 1993 self-titled debut to feature the original Rancid logo on the cover. The band recorded the album between December 2015 and January 2017 at Big Bad Sound, Sunset Sound, and Red Star.

Reception 

Trouble Maker received mixed reviews upon its release. AllMusic writer Tim Sendra rated the album two-and-a-half stars out of five and called it "exactly what a Rancid fan would expect a Rancid album to sound like, which is both a blessing and a curse." He continued, "The former because if classic Rancid is what you need to fulfill your punk rock longings, as always they deliver the requisite gutter chants, spiky attitude, and spit-covered microphones. The latter because at this point the Rancid sound can't help but feel a little too safe and sanitized, especially given the sparkling production Brett Gurewitz gives to the album. It may be a little late in the game to expect the band to do anything but give the fans exactly what they want, or what the band thinks they want, but it's not too much to ask for songs that have a bit less studio gloss and a little more fire and grit."

Background and recording
Originally Rancid intended to record an EPs worth of material in December 2015.

The tracks written solely by Tim were meant for Tim's second solo album which was recorded with Matt on bass and Joey Castillo on drums. Upon hearing the tracks Brett Gurewitz suggested Rancid go back into the studio and use these towards a new Rancid album.

Track listing

Personnel
Rancid
Tim Armstrong – vocals, guitars 
Lars Frederiksen – guitars, vocals
Matt Freeman – bass guitar, vocals
Branden Steineckert – drums, percussion

Studio musicians
Kevin Bivona - organ, keyboards
The Interrupters - backing vocals

Charts

References

2017 albums
Rancid (band) albums
Epitaph Records albums
Hellcat Records albums